Tropical splenomegaly syndrome, also known as hyperreactive malarial splenomegaly, occurs due immunological overstimulation to repeated attacks of malarial infection over a long period of time. Condition is usually seen in malaria-endemic areas like Africa and Indian subcontinent. Tropical Splenomegaly Syndrome is characterized by massive splenomegaly, hepatomegaly, marked elevations in levels of serum IgM and anti-malarial antibodies. The spleen is massively enlarged. It shows dilated sinusoids lined with reticulum cells. There is a marked erythrophagocytosis and lymphocytic infiltration of the pulp. Peripheral smear for malarial parasite is usually negative.

Condition may show features of hypersplenism in severe form like anemia and thrombocytopenia.

The treatment of tropical splenomegaly syndrome involve administration of antimalarial drug followed by prophylaxis for prolonged periods of time. This remove the add-on antigenic stimulus of repeated malarial infections and allow the reticuloendothelial system to return to normal.

Notes

References
 Greenwood B, Fakunle Y. The tropical splenomegaly syndrome. In: The role of the spleen in the immunology of parasitic disease. Basel: Schwabe, 1979: 229–251.                  
 Fakunle Y. Tropical splenomegaly. In: Luzzatto L, ed. Clinics in haematology. London: WB Saunders, 1981: 963–975.                      
 Neelam Raval, Neela Shah and S. N. Vani: Tropical splenomegaly syndrome, Indian Journal of Pediatrics, Volume 58, Number 5, 679–681, 

Syndromes
Malaria